A. Subba Rao may refer to:
 Adurthi Subba Rao, Indian film director, cinematographer and screenwriter
 A. Subba Rao (politician), Indian politician